Inape penai is a species of moth of the family Tortricidae and is endemic to Bolivia. The habitat consists of tropical cloud forests.

References

Moths described in 1988
Endemic fauna of Bolivia
Moths of South America
penai
Taxa named by Józef Razowski